Liberty Kenya Holdings Limited is a major Kenyan Insurance company that is a subsidiary of the South African Liberty Holdings Limited, a Pan-African financial services company.

The group's headquarters are located in Nairobi, Kenya, with subsidiaries in Kenya and Tanzania. The flagship company of the group is CFC Life, with headquarters in the CFC House along Mamlaka Road in Nairobi, Kenya's capital and largest city.

History
The group was founded in Kenya in 1964 as the Kenya American Insurance Company Limited as part of the AIG Group of companies. In 1987, the organization changed its name to American Life Insurance Company (Kenya) Limited – ALICO Kenya. CfC Bank holdings acquired ALICO Kenya in 2004 and changed its name to CfC Life Assurance Company Ltd.

In 2008, CfC Bank holdings merged with Stanbic bank forming CFC Stanbic Bank Holding which was now a subsidiary of the Standard Bank Group.

In 2011, Liberty Holdings Limited became the strategic investor in CfC Life and Heritage with the listing of CfC Insurance Holdings on the Nairobi Securities Exchange through introduction. This was a form of demerger from CFC Stanbic Holdings which separated the banking and insurance business of the group. Existing CFC Stanbic Holdings Shareholders were allocated shares in the newly-listed company. This was the first company spin-off on the NSE

In 2012, The company changed its name from CFC Insurance Holdings to Liberty Kenya Holdings Limited  to align the group to the Liberty Group corporate brand.

In 2014, Liberty Kenya Holdings made history again by being the first listed firm in Kenya to have a scrip issue. This was a cash-retention strategy by the firm. The group announced that its life insurance subsidiary, CfC Life Assurance Company was re-branding to Liberty Life Assurance Kenya Limited with effect from 28 October 2014.

Principal subsidiaries
Liberty Kenya Holdings Limited consists of the following companies:
Liberty Life Assurance Kenya Limited - Life insurance - Nairobi, Kenya  100% Shareholding - A Insurance company in Kenya offering long term life insurance and assurance services. This is the flagship company of the group.
Heritage Insurance Company Kenya Limited - General insurance - Nairobi, Kenya  100% Shareholding - A Insurance company in Kenya offering short-term and general insurance services.
Heritage Insurance Company of Tanzania - General insurance - Dar es Salaam, Tanzania  60% - A Insurance company in Tanzania offering short-term and general insurance services. This entity is held by the group through Heritage Insurance Company Kenya Limited.
CfC Investments Limited - Investments - Nairobi, Kenya  100% Shareholding - Offers investment services.
Azali Limited - Dormant - Nairobi, Kenya  100% Shareholding - This entity is held by the group through Heritage Insurance Company Kenya Limited.

The group has one associate company which is:
Strategis Insurance Tanzania Limited - General insurance - Dar es Salaam, Tanzania  43% - An Insurance company in Tanzania offering corporate and group medical insurance services. This entity is held by the group through Heritage Insurance Company Tanzania Limited.  On May 1, 2014, the group announced that it was in talks with its co-investors in Strategis that could see the Group take a majority stake or acquire all of Strategis’ shares.

Ownership
The shares of Liberty Kenya Holdings Limited are listed on the Nairobi Stock Exchange (NSE), where they trade under the symbol CFCI. The shareholding of Liberty Kenya Holdings is as follows:

Governance 
Liberty Kenya Holdings Limited is governed by a five-person Board of Directors with Philip Odera as the chairperson an Mike du Toit as the Managing Director.

See also
 CfC Stanbic Holdings
 Economy of Kenya
 Liberty Holdings Limited
 List of Insurance companies in Kenya
 Nairobi Stock Exchange
 Standard Bank Group

References

External links
 CFC Stanbic Bank, Kenya official site
 Liberty Holdings official Site

Financial services companies established in 1964
Insurance companies of Kenya
Companies listed on the Nairobi Securities Exchange
Kenyan companies established in 1964